Jonna Marika Tervomaa (born January 7, 1973) is a Finnish pop singer and songwriter. She was born in Forssa, and became famous at the age of ten, when she won the song contest "Syksyn Sävel" with the song "Minttu sekä Ville". Tervomaa started her adult career in 1998 with her self-titled album.

Tervomaa's biggest hits include "Suljettu sydän" (1998), "Yhtä en saa" (1999), "Rakkauden haudalla" (Helmiä ja sikoja soundtrack, 2003), "Myöhemmin" (2004) and "Se ei kuulu mulle" (2004).

Discography

Albums 

Compilations

Singles

References

External links 

1973 births
Living people
People from Forssa
21st-century Finnish women singers
20th-century Finnish women singers